Robert Graham Cunningham (born February 26, 1941) is a retired professional ice hockey centre. He played   for the New York Rangers.

External links
 

1941 births
Living people
Baltimore Clippers players
Canadian ice hockey centres
Denver Spurs (WHL) players
Guelph Biltmore Mad Hatters players
Guelph Royals players
Sportspeople from Welland
New York Rangers players
Port Huron Flags (IHL) players
Pittsburgh Hornets players
St. Louis Braves players
Ice hockey people from Ontario
Canadian expatriate ice hockey players in the United States